Articles related to Toronto include:

0–9 

 509 Harbourfront
 545 Lake Shore Boulevard West

A 

 Agincourt
 Alderwood
 Alexandra Park
 Allenby
 Amesbury
 Amsterdam Bridge
 The Annex
 Annual events in Toronto
 Armadale
 Armour Heights
 Art Gallery of Ontario

B 

 Baby Point
 Bata Shoe Museum
 Bathurst Manor
 Bayview Village
 Bayview Woods-Steeles
 Bead Hill
 The Beaches
 Bedford Park
 Bellevue Square
 Bendale
 Bermondsey
 Billy Bishop Toronto City Airport
 Billy Bishop Toronto City Water Aerodrome
 Birch Cliff
 Bloor GO Station
 Bloor Street Culture Corridor
 Bloor West Village
 Bloordale Village
 Bracondale Hill
 Bridle Path
 Brockton Village
 Brown's Corners

C 

 Cabbagetown
 Canada Malting Silos
 Caplansky's Delicatessen
 Captain John's Harbour Boat Restaurant
 Carleton Village
 Casa Loma
 Centreville Amusement Park
 Chaplin Estates
 Chinatown
 Chinatowns in Toronto
 Christie Pits
 Church and Wellesley
 CityPlace
 Clairlea
 Clairville
 Clanton Park
 Cliffcrest
 Cliffside
 Corktown
 Corso Italia
 Corso Italia-Davenport
 Crescent Town
 Crothers Woods
 Culture in Toronto

D 

 Davenport
 David A. Balfour Park
 Davisville Village
 Dean of Toronto
 Deer Park
 Demographics of Toronto neighbourhoods
 Discovery District
 Distillery District
 Don Mills
 Don River
 Don Valley Village
 Doors Open Toronto
 Dorset Park
 Downtown Yonge
 Dovercourt Park
 Downsview
 Dufferin Grove

E 

 Eatonville
 Earlscourt
 East Bayfront
 East Chinatown
 East Danforth
 East Toronto
 East York
 Eglinton, Ontario
 Eglinton Avenue
 Eglinton East
 Eglinton station
 Eglinton West
 The Elms
 Entertainment District
 Eringate-Centennial-West Deane
 Etobicoke
 Etobicoke Board of Education

F 

 Fairbank
 Fashion District
 Financial District
 Flemingdon Park
 Forest Hill
 Fort Rouillé
 Fort Toronto
 Fort York
 Fort York Armoury
 Fort York (neighbourhood)

G 

 Garden District
 Gerrard India Bazaar
 Geography of Toronto
 Gibraltar Point Lighthouse
 Glen Park
 GO Transit
 Golden Mile
 Governor's Bridge
 Grange Park
 Graydon Hall
 Greater Toronto Area
 Greektown
 Greenbelt (Golden Horseshoe)
 Guildwood

H 

 Ned Hanlan
 Hanlan's Point Beach
 Hanlan's Point Stadium
 Harbord Village
 Harbour Square Park
 Harbourfront
 Harbourfront Centre
 Henry Farm
 High Park
 High Park North
 Highland Creek
 Hillcrest Village
 History of neighbourhoods in Toronto
 History of Toronto
 History of Toronto Island Airport
 Hoggs Hollow
 HTO Park
 Humber Bay
 Humber Heights-Westmount
 Humber Islands
 Humber Summit
 Humber River
 Humber River Hospital
 Humber Valley Village
 Humbermede
 Humberwood
 Humewood–Cedarvale

I 

 International Festival of Authors
 Ionview
 Ireland Park
 Island Public/Natural Science School
 Island Yacht Club
 Islington-City Centre West
 Islington station

J 

 Jack Layton Ferry Terminal
 James Gardens
 Jane and Finch
 The Junction
 Junction Triangle

K 

 Kensington Market
 King of Kensington
 Kingsview Village
 The Kingsway
 Koreatown

L 

 Lake Ontario
 Lambton
 L'Amoreaux
 Lansing
 Lawrence Heights
 Lawrence Manor
 Lawrence Park
 Leaside
 Leslie Street Spit
 Leslieville
 Liberty Village
 Little Italy
 Little Norway Park
 Little Tibet
 Long Branch
 Lytton Park

M 

 Malvern
 Maple Leaf, Toronto
 Maple Leaf Mills Silos
 Markland Wood
 Maryvale
 Media in Toronto
 Metrolinx
 Metropolitan Street Railway
 Midtown
 Milliken
 Mimico
 Moore Park
 Morningside
 Morningside Heights
 Moss Park
 Mount Dennis
 Museum station

N 

 New Toronto
 Newtonbrook
 Niagara, Toronto
 Nathan Phillips Square
 North Toronto
 North York
 North York City Centre
 No. 8 Hose Station

O 

 Oakridge
 Oakwood Village
 O'Connor–Parkview
 Old East York
 Old Mill
 Old Toronto
 Old Town
 Ontario Legislative Building

P 

 Palmerston-Little Italy
 Pape Village
 Parkdale
 Parkway Forest
 Parkwoods
 Pelmo Park-Humberlea
 Playter Estates
 Pleasant View
 Politics of Toronto
 Polson Iron Works Limited
 Port Lands
 Port Union
 The Power Plant
 Princess Gardens

Q 

 Quayside
 Queen City Yacht Club (Toronto)
 Queen Street West
 Queen's Park
 Queens Quay
 Queens Quay station
 Queen's Quay Terminal
 The Queensway-Humber Bay

R 

 Railway Lands
 Regent Park
 Rexdale
 Richview
 Riverdale
 Roncesvalles
 Rosedale
 Rouge
 Royal Canadian Yacht Club
 Royal Ontario Museum
 Rustic
 Runnymede

S 

 St. Andrew's Market and Playground
 St. James Town
 St. Lawrence
 Scarborough
 Scarborough Bluffs
 Scarborough City Centre
 Scarborough Junction
 Scarborough Village
 Seaton Village
 Sidewalk Toronto
 Silverthorn
 Simcoe Street Tunnel
 Smithfield
 Small's Pond
 South Core
 South Hill
 Southcore Financial Centre
 Spadina station
 Steeles (neighbourhood)
 Summerhill
 Superior Creek
 Swansea

T 

 Taber Hill
 Tam O'Shanter-Sullivan
 Teddington Park
 Teiaiagon
 This Ain't the Rosedale Library
 Thistletown
 Thistletown Collegiate Institute
 Thomson Memorial Park
 Thorncliffe Park
 Toronto
 Toronto Catholic District School Board
 Toronto Ferry Company
 Toronto Harbour
 Toronto Harbour Commission Building
 Toronto International Dragon Boat Race Festival
 Toronto International Film Festival
 Toronto Island ferries
 Toronto Islands
 Toronto Railway Museum
 Toronto ravine system
 Toronto streetcar system
 Toronto subway
 Toronto Transit Commission
 Toronto waterfront
 Trefann Court
 Trinity-Bellwoods
 Twitch City

U 

 Union Station
 Upper Beaches
 Uptown Toronto

V 

 Vale of Avoca (bridge)
 Vale of Avoca (ravine)
 Victoria Village
 Videofag

W 

 Wallace Emerson
 Walter Carsen Centre
 The Ward
 Waterfront Toronto
 WaveDecks
 West Don Lands
 West Hill
 West Rouge
 Westin Harbour Castle Hotel
 Westminster-Branson
 Weston
 Wexford
 Willowdale
 Woburn
 Workmen's Compensation Board Building
 World Trade Centre Toronto
 Wychwood Park

X

Y 

 Yonge–Eglinton
 York
 York Mills
 York University Heights
 Yorkville

Z

See also 

 Index of Ontario-related articles

Toronto
 
Toronto